Tim Emmett (born 1973–74), is a British-born adventure climber and climbing author, who practices to a high level in a diverse range of climbing disciplines, being ice-climbing, rock climbing, deep-water soloing (of which he is considered a pioneer) and alpine climbing.  Emmett has established the hardest waterfall ice-climbs in the world, and was the first to climb grades of W10 and above.

Early life 
Tim Emmett was born in Taunton in Somerset in England, and went to school at Richard Huish College, where he got his A-levels in Biology, Chemistry and Mathematics.  While at Huish,  Emmett started climbing on a school trip at the age of 15 to a local crag called Chudleigh Rocks.  In 1993, he went on to study Marine Zoology at Bangor University, North Wales, where he became a prominent climber, featuring on the magazine cover of On The Edge while still at university.

Career

Deep-water soloing
Emmett is regarded as a pioneer of deep-water soloing (DWS), and in 2003, a short film on DWS called Psicobloc by American brothers Josh and Brett Lowell chronicled Emmett and Klem Loskot's 2001 development of DWS routes in Cova Del Diablo in Mallorca, Spain, which inspired US rock climber Chris Sharma to get involved in DWS. In 2019, adventure filmmaker Jon Glassberg, created another DWS short film called Deep Water featured on Emmett and US rock-climber Kyra Condie developing DWS routes in Ha Long Bay in Vietnam.

Ice climbing

Emmett's notable ice-climbs include the first ever waterfall ice climb at grade W10 (Spray On, in 2010 with Will Gadd, at Helmcken Falls), at grade W11 (Wolverine, in 2011 with Klemen Premrl, at Helmcken Falls), at grade W12 (Interstellar Spice, in 2016 with Klemen Premrl, at Helmcken Falls), and at grade W13 (Misson to Mars, in 2020 with Klemen Premrl, at Helmcken Falls).  From 2002 to 2007, Emmett made the podium 4 times in tour events of the World Ice Climbing Championships.  In 2015, Emmett was the Red Bull "White Cliffs Champion".

Rock climbing

Emmett's rock climbs include some of the highest-grade traditional routes with notable ascents including the 2017 repeat of Sonnie Trotter's Superman in Squamish (5.14c, F8c+), and the 2016 repeat of Trotter's The Path in Lake Louise (5.14R, F8b+).  In 2010, Emmett established Muy Caliente!, and early contender for the first traditional grade of E10 in Pembroke in Wales.

Alpine climbing

For high altitude alpine climbing, Emmett was nominated for a 2006 Piolet D'or for climbing a new route on the south east pillar of Kedar Dome  in the Garhwal Himalaya with Ian Parnell 2006.  In 2019, Emmett and his team had to abandon an expedition to Mount Everest due to the avalanche risk on the route they were planning.

Para-alpinism

With para-alpinism, two adventure sports are merged, BASE jumping, and big wall climbing.  After ascending a large wall on vertical rock, Emmett put a parachute on to descend down. Only a handful of people do this type of climbing, and Emmett retired from it at the age of 40 due to its high risk of fatality. Emmett has also done wingsuit flying.

Media 
Emmett has appeared in more than 50 magazines that of which include Outside Magazine, Sports Illustrated, Gripped, Grip, Desnivel, GQ and others. Emmett has been the subject of several short films on climbing, including Psiobloc (2003), Dosage II (2004), Dosage III (2005), Welsh Connections (2009), Mountain (2017), and Deep Water (2019).

Emmett has made several appearances on the BBC as a presenter and guest, including: Ultimate Rock Climb with Julia Bradbury (2007), The Great Climb with British climber Dave MacLeod (2010), and Top Gear (episode 2, season 7) with Jeremy Clarkson racing up a mountain with Leo Houlding (2005).  Emmett has worked with Steve Backshall on his children's show.

In 2005, Emmett wrote a book with fellow British-climber Neil Gresham called Preposterous Tales, about their climbing exploits around the world.

He has presented the Duke Of Edinburgh Award three times at St. James's Palace.

Personal
Emmett moved to Canada and is married and living in Squamish.

See also
Mountain Hardwear, Emmett's long-term sponsor
Mountain, 2017 film that includes Tim Emmett

References

External links 
 
 
 Tim Emmett Filmography at MNTNFILM Database (2021)

Living people
People from Taunton
Alumni of Bangor University
British rock climbers
English mountain climbers
Ice climbers
1973 births